Justice Searle may refer to:

Elhanan J. Searle, associate justice of the Arkansas Supreme Court
Nathaniel Searle, associate justice of the Rhode Island Supreme Court
Clifford H. Searl, justice of Supreme Court of New York